The 53rd Dan Kolov & Nikola Petrov Tournament,  was a sport wrestling event held in  Sofia, Bulgaria between 24 and 26 April 2015.

This international tournament includes competition in both men's and women's freestyle wrestling and men's Greco-Roman wrestling. This tournament is held in honor of Dan Kolov who was the first European freestyle wrestling champion from Bulgaria and  European and World Champion Nikola Petroff.

Event videos
The event was air freely on the Bulgarian Wrestling Federation Live YouTube channel.

Medal table

Medal overview

Men's freestyle

Greco-Roman

Women's freestyle

Participating nations

299 competitors from 28 nations participated.
 (1)
 (11)
 (11)
 (9)
 (1)
 (66)
 (1)
 (14)
 (1)
 (22)
 (1)
 (5)
 (9)
 (5)
 (15)
 (3)
 (2)
 (2)
 (5)
 (7)
 (24)
 (3)
 (6)
 (3)
 (16)
 (23)
 (14)
United World Wrestling (9)

References 

2015 in European sport
2015 in sport wrestling
April 2015 sports events in Europe
2015 in Bulgarian sport